American Me is the title of the first solo album by hip hop artist CL Smooth, released on October 31, 2006. The project is the rapper's first solo album, since breaking up with partner Pete Rock in 1995; he had not released an album since 1994's The Main Ingredient.

The album's lead single is the title track, which features "Smoke in the Air" as its B-side.

Track listing

References

External links
 CL Smooth official site

2006 albums
CL Smooth albums
Albums produced by KayGee
Albums produced by Pete Rock
Albums produced by the Heatmakerz